The  is a 2-car electric multiple unit (EMU) train type operated by the Japanese private railway operator Chichibu Railway on Chichibu Main Line local services since 16 March 2013.

Overview
The first 2-car train was converted from former Tokyu 8090 series cars in 2012 by Tokyu Techo Systems. Conversion details include the removal of electrical equipment from one former motored car, the addition two lozenge-type pantographs on the DeHa 7800 car, and the addition of new cab ends.

Formations
The 2-car sets are formed as follows, with one motored ("M") car and one non-powered trailer ("T") car.

The DeHa 7800 car is fitted with two lozenge-type pantographs.

History
The first set was rebuilt by Tokyu Techno Systems in December 2012. It entered service from the start of the revised timetable on 16 March 2013.

Build details

The conversion histories and former identities of the fleet are as shown below.

References

External links

 Chichibu Railway news release (15 February 2013) 

Electric multiple units of Japan
Train-related introductions in 2013
Chichibu Railway
Tokyu Car multiple units
1500 V DC multiple units of Japan

ja:秩父鉄道7800系電車